Douglas, Doug or Dougie Smith may refer to:

Arts and entertainment
 Douglas Smith (broadcaster) (1924–1972), British radio broadcaster
 Doug Smith (composer) (born 1963), American composer and pianist
 Douglas Burnet Smith (born 1949), Canadian poet
 Ivan Stang (born 1953), American author born Douglass St. Clair Smith
 Douglas E. Smith (1960–2014), American video game designer
 Douglas Smith (actor) (born 1985), Canadian-American actor
 Douglas Smith (special effects artist), visual effects artist of Independence Day movie
 Douglas Smith (writer), American writer and historian of Russia

Politics
 Dougie Smith (born 1962), British political advisor
 W. Douglas Smith (born 1958), American politician from South Carolina
 Douglas Smith (Maine politician) (born 1946), American politician from Maine
 Douglas M. Smith (born 1990), American politician from New York
 Doug Smith (politician) (born 1967), American politician from West Virginia

Sports
 Doug Smith (pitcher) (1892–1973), former MLB baseball player
 Doug Smith (baseball coach), American college baseball coach
 Doug Smith (basketball) (born 1969), American former basketball player
 Doug Smith (offensive lineman) (born 1956), retired NFL American football offensive lineman
 Doug Smith (defensive lineman) (born 1960), retired NFL American football defensive lineman
 Doug Smith (Canadian football) (born 1952), retired CFL Canadian football offensive lineman
 Doug Smith (footballer, born 1937) (1937–2012), Scottish former Dundee United footballer
 Doug Smith (footballer, born 1922) (1922–2009), former Australian rules footballer for Collingwood
 Doug Smith (footballer, born 1957), former Australian rules footballer for North Melbourne
 Douglas Smith (Australian cricketer) (1880–1933), Australian cricketer
 Douglas Smith (English cricketer) (1915–2001), English cricketer
 Douglas Smith (Guyanese cricketer) (1884–?), Guyanese cricketer
 Douglas James Smith (1873–1949), cricketer
 Doug Smith (jockey) (1917–1989), English flat racing jockey
 Doug Smith (ice hockey) (born 1963), former NHL ice hockey player
 Doug Smith (author) (born 1964), former minor-league ice hockey player and author
 Doug Smith (sportscaster) (1920s–1979), Canadian radio broadcaster
 Doug Smith (rugby union) (1924–1998), Scottish rugby union player and administrator